Alla Kudryavtseva and Anastasia Rodionova were the defending champions, but decided not to participate this year.

Lucie Hradecká and Mirjana Lučić-Baroni won the title, defeating Julia Görges and Andrea Hlaváčková 6–3, 7–6(10–8) in the final.

Seeds

Draw

References
Main Draw

Coupe Banque Nationale
Tournoi de Québec
Can